Sieraków is a village in the administrative district of Gmina Przyrów, within Częstochowa County, Silesian Voivodeship, in southern Poland.

The village has a population of 242.

People

References 

Villages in Częstochowa County